"Mina minnen" is a song written by Lotta Ahlin, and recorded by Shirley Clamp on her 2005 studio album "Lever mina drömmar", as well as being released as a single the same year. The song lyrics deal with a girl being disappointed when her father leaves the family.

The song charted at Svensktoppen for five weeks between 21 August,-18 September 2005 before leaving the chart, peaking at number seven on 11 September 2005.

References

External links

2005 singles
Shirley Clamp songs
Swedish-language songs
2005 songs